Frank Fenton Moran (April 9, 1906 – July 24, 1957), known as Frank Fenton, was an American stage, film and television actor.

Early years
Born Francis Fenton Moran, the Georgetown University graduate lettered as a tackle on the school's football team. He also was active in Georgetown's undergraduate dramatic club, for which he directed and wrote plays.

Career 
Fenton started his career on stage in New York, acting on Broadway in An American Tragedy (1926) billed as Frank Moran. As Frank Fenton, he starred in the Broadway versions of Susan and God with Gertrude Lawrence and as George Kittredge in The Philadelphia Story (1939) alongside Katharine Hepburn. His other Broadway credits include Stork Mad, O Evening Star, Dead End, and The O'Flynn. He also appeared on stage in London, and toured with Katherine Cornell in Romeo & Juliet and other plays.

Fenton's film debut came in The Navy Comes Through (1942). After moving to Hollywood for Barbara Stanwyck's Lady of Burlesque (1943), the Hartford, Connecticut native appeared in more than 80 movies and television programs. Although the majority of his motion picture career was spent in supporting roles, he starred alongside John Carradine in Isle of Forgotten Sins (1943), which was re-issued as Monsoon.

Fenton was married from 1934 to 1948 to the former Aqueena Bilotti, daughter of sculptor Salvadore Bilotti. The couple had two daughters, Alicia and Honoree. They divorced in 1948.

He is often confused—in print and online—with screenwriter and novelist Frank Fenton (1903 – August 23, 1971). The actor dropped his last name early in his career to avoid confusion with other well-known Morans in New York City, including prizefighter Frank Moran, drama reporter Frank Moran, and George Moran of the popular comedy team Moran and Mack.

Death
Fenton died at UCLA Medical Center on July 24, 1957, at age 51. He is buried in Holy Cross Cemetery in Culver City, California.

Partial filmography

 The Navy Comes Through (1942) - Hodum
 Claudia (1943) - Hartley (uncredited)
 Aerial Gunner (1943) - Colonel - HAGS CO (uncredited)
 Lady of Burlesque (1943) - Russell Rogers
 Isle of Forgotten Sins (1943) - Jack Burke
 A Scream in the Dark (1943) - Sam 'Benny' Lackey
 Minesweeper (1943) - Lt. Ralph Gilpin
 Hi, Good Lookin'! (1944) - Gib Dickson
 Rosie the Riveter (1944) - Wayne Calhoun
 Buffalo Bill (1944) - Murdo Carvell
 Secret Command (1944) - Simms
 The Big Noise (1944) - Charlton
 Destiny (1944) - Sam Baker
 This Man's Navy (1945) - Captain Grant
 Hold That Blonde (1945) - Mr. Phillips
 Club Havana (1945) - Detective Lieutenant (uncredited)
 Getting Gertie's Garter (1945) - Winters (uncredited)
 The French Key (1946) - Horatio Vedder
 Big Town (1946) - Fletcher (uncredited)
 Swamp Fire (1946) - Capt. Pete Dailey
 If I'm Lucky (1946) - Marc Dwyer, Political Boss (uncredited)
 It's a Wonderful Life (1946) - Violet's Boyfriend (uncredited)
 Hit Parade of 1947 (1947) - Mr. Bonardi
 The Adventures of Don Coyote (1947) - Big Foot Ferguson
 Philo Vance's Secret Mission (1947) - Paul Morgan
 Magic Town (1947) - Birch
 Relentless (1948) - Jim Rupple
 Hazard (1948) - Utah Sheriff Bob Waybill
 A Foreign Affair (1948) - Major Mathews
 Bodyguard (1948) - Lt. Borden
 Renegades of Sonora (1948) - Sheriff Jim Crawford
 Mexican Hayride (1948) - Gus Adamson
 Rustlers (1949) - Brad Carew
 The Clay Pigeon (1949) - Lt. Cmdr. Prentice
 Joe Palooka in the Big Fight (1949) - Detective
 The Doolins of Oklahoma (1949) - Red Buck
 Ranger of Cherokee Strip (1949) - McKinnon
 The Golden Stallion (1949) - Oro City Sheriff
 Port of New York (1949) - G.W. Wyley (uncredited)
 The Lawless (1950) - Mr. Prentiss
 Sideshow (1950) - Manson
 Trigger, Jr. (1950) - Sheriff
 A Modern Marriage (1950) - Mr. Brown
 Streets of Ghost Town (1950) - Bart Selby
 Three Secrets (1950) - Sheriff Neil MacDonald (uncredited)
 Wyoming Mail (1950) - Gilson
 Tripoli (1950) - Capt. Adams
 Double Deal (1950) - Pete (uncredited)
 Prairie Roundup (1951) - Buck Prescott
 Rogue River (1951) - Joe Dandridge
 Texans Never Cry (1951) - Captain Weldon (uncredited)
 Silver City (1951) - Creede (uncredited)
 The Legend of the Lone Ranger (1952) - Ranger Captain (uncredited)
 Man in the Dark (1953) - Detective Driver (uncredited)
 Raiders of the Seven Seas (1953) - Salcedo's Officer (uncredited)
 Island in the Sky (1953) - Capt. Turner
 Vicki (1953) - Eric (uncredited)
 Gun Fury (1953) - Chuck - First Poker Player (uncredited)
 The Nebraskan (1953) - Army Captain (uncredited)
 Fury at Gunsight Pass (1956) - Sheriff Meeker
 The Naked Hills (1956) - Harold
 Cha-Cha-Cha Boom! (1956) - Head of Board of Directors (uncredited)
 Emergency Hospital (1956) - Edward Northrup (uncredited)
 Gun the Man Down (1956) - Sheriff Leading Posse (uncredited)
 Hell Bound (1957) - Harry Quantro (final film role)

References

External links

Brief biography and links to films

1906 births
1957 deaths
20th-century American male actors
American male film actors
American male stage actors
Georgetown University alumni
Male actors from Hartford, Connecticut